Tagetes lucida is a perennial plant native to Mexico and Central America.  It is used as a medicinal plant and as a culinary herb.  The leaves have a tarragon-like scent, with hints of anise, and it has entered the nursery trade in North America as a tarragon substitute.  Common names include  sweetscented marigold, Mexican marigold, Mexican mint marigold, Mexican tarragon, sweet mace, Texas tarragon, pericón, yerbaniz, and hierbanís.

Description
Depending on the variety or landrace, the plant may be fairly upright, while other forms appear bushy with many unbranching stems. In late summer it bears clusters of small golden yellow flower heads on the ends of the stems. The flowers are hermaphroditic (have both male and female organs) and are pollinated by insects.

Traditional use
Tagetes lucida was used by the Aztecs in a ritual incense known as Yauhtli, as well as being dedicated to the rain god . Tagetes lucida is still in use today primarily as a tea to treat the common cold, intestinal gas and diarrhea.

It has been reported that the Huichol of Mexico use the plant as an entheogen by smoking Tagetes lucida with Nicotiana rustica, and that Tagetes lucida is occasionally smoked alone as an hallucinogen. Archaeologists found that the Maya used Tagetes lucida as an additive in tobacco mixtures.

Tagetes lucida also had many culinary uses by the Aztecs including as one of the ingredients added to make the drink chocolatl, which gave it a spicy flavor. Fresh or dried leaves are also used as a tarragon substitute for flavoring soups and sauces. A pleasant anise-flavored tea is brewed using the dried leaves and flower heads. This is primarily used medicinally in Mexico and Central America.

A yellow dye can also be obtained from the flowers, and when the plant is dried and burnt, it is used as an incense and to repel insects.

In one study, methanolic extract from the flower inhibited growth of Staphylococcus aureus, E. coli, and Candida albicans cultures. This effect was enhanced with exposure to ultraviolet light.  The roots, stems, and leaves also had the same effect when irradiated with ultraviolet light.

Phytochemistry
The plant contains the following compounds:
Anethole
Chavicol
Coumarin
Estragole
Isorhamnetin
Methyleugenol
Quercetin

References

External links

Erowid Vault about Calendula

lucida
Flora of Mexico
Flora of Central America
Herbs
Agriculture in Mesoamerica
Crops originating from Mexico
Herbal tea
Plants described in 1796
Garden plants of North America
Drought-tolerant plants
Taxa named by Antonio José Cavanilles